Miroslav "Miro" Mentel (born 2 December 1962 in Šurany) is a former Slovak footballer, currently is coach of goalkeepers in Slovakia national football team and also FK Senica.

Mentel played for FK Inter Bratislava, Dukla Banská Bystrica and DAC Dunajská Streda in the Czechoslovak First League. He also played a season in the Gambrinus liga following the dissolution of Czechoslovakia for FC Kaučuk Opava.

He coached SFC Opava.

Club statistics

References

External links

Living people
1962 births
Slovak footballers
Czechoslovak footballers
Slovak football managers
ŠK Slovan Bratislava managers
J1 League players
Urawa Red Diamonds players
Czech First League players
SFC Opava players
Slovak expatriate footballers
Expatriate footballers in Japan
SFC Opava managers
Association football goalkeepers
People from Šurany
Sportspeople from the Nitra Region